Las Catalinas Resort is an exclusive privately owned and managed resort developed in 2006 along the shores of the Pacific Ocean in the Guanacaste Province of northwest Costa Rica. The objective was to create a compact, car-free, and fully walkable resort, based on the principles of New Urbanism. Las Catalinas was founded by Charles Brewer (businessman), who was intrigued by the affect walkable private resorts have on the health, happiness and well being, of humans.

Summary
Las Catalinas Resort is located on the coast of Playa Danta and Playa Dantita near Potrero, near Daniel Oduber Quiros International Airport in Liberia. Projected as a 20+ year project, the exclusive private beach resort incorporates the principles of New Urbanism to enable an environment that claims to favor human connection and interaction with numerous urban facilities. It is located in at the center of over 404 hectares of tropical dry forest hills and valleys. Las Catalinas has an extensive network of hiking, running, and biking trails and has an annual Triathlon and Open Water competition.

Tourism
Las Catalinas Resort has been featured in major travel publications such as Travel + Leisure, The New York Times, and The Wall Street Journal. The exclusive private resort has gained international acclaim for its small-town environment, authentic Costa Rican culture, and scenery. The resort offers stays in a hotel, villas, and apartments. Its architecture was inspired by colonial towns in Latin America such as Antigua, Panama's Casco Viejo, Panama, and San Miguel de Allende, as well as Mediterranean hill and coastal towns. The natural environment and proximity to the sea makes swimming, standup paddleboarding, kayaking, boogie boarding, and snorkeling popular activities in the area.

Natural Reserve 
It harbors diverse, local flora and fauna including numerous bird species, howler monkeys, iguanas, and the occasional wild cat. There are about 35 kilometers of hiking, running and single track mountain biking trails. The resort is car-free.

Architecture and Urbanism

Urban Design
The planning of Las Catalinas Resort was primarily executed by Douglas Duany, currently a professor at the University of Notre Dame School of Architecture. It is densely designed and focuses on the pedestrian experience by maximizing views and integrating na; -855682 Coordinates:ares, approximately 80 hectares are planned to be built on, while the remaining 404 hectares will be left as a natural reserve.

Architecture
Many urban designers and architects have since done design work in Las Catalinas, including: 
 Lew Oliver Inc.
 TSW
 ASARQ
 Robert Orr
 Abraham Valenzuela
 Gary Justiss
 Dungan-Nequette
 Michael G. Imber
 Garrison Foundry
 BCV Architects
 Lauren Richa
 Studio Sky

References

External links
Las Catalinas website
Santarena Hotel website
Congress for the New Urbanism
Sustainable Urban Development Resource Guide

New Urbanism communities
Urban design
New Classical architecture